In Major League Baseball, the National League Division Series (NLDS) determines which two teams from the National League will advance to the National League Championship Series. The Division Series consists of two best-of-five series, featuring each of the two division winners with the best records and the winners of the wild-card play-offs.

History

The Division Series was implemented in 1981 as a one-off tournament because of a midseason strike, with the first place teams before the strike taking on the teams in first place after the strike. In 1981, a split-season format forced the first ever divisional playoff series, in which the Montreal Expos won the Eastern Division series over the Philadelphia Phillies in five games while in the Western Division, the Los Angeles Dodgers defeated the Houston Astros, also in five games (the Astros were members of the National League until 2012). 

In 1994, it was returned permanently when Major League Baseball (MLB) restructured each league into three divisions, but with a different format than in 1981. Each of the division winners, along with one wild card team, qualify for the Division Series.  Despite being planned for the 1994 season, the post-season was cancelled that year due to the 1994–95 Major League Baseball strike.  In 1995, the first season to feature a division series, the Eastern Division champion Atlanta Braves defeated the wild card Colorado Rockies three games to one, while the Central Division champion Cincinnati Reds defeated the Western Division champion Los Angeles Dodgers in a three game sweep.

From 1994 to 2011, the wild card was given to the team in the National League with the best overall record that was not a division champion.  Beginning with the 2012 season, a second wild card team was added, and the two wild card teams play a single-game playoff to determine which team would play in the NLDS.  For the 2020 Major League Baseball season only, there was an expanded playoff format, owing to an abbreviated 60-game regular season due to the COVID-19 pandemic.  Eight teams qualified from the National League: the top two teams in each division plus the next two best records among the remaining teams.  These eight teams played a best-of-three game series to determine placement in the NLDS. The regular format returned for the 2021 season.

As of 2021, the Atlanta Braves have currently played in the most NL division series with seventeen appearances. The St. Louis Cardinals have currently won the most NL division series, winning eleven of the fourteen series in which they have played. The Pittsburgh Pirates (who finished with a losing record from 1993 to 2012) were the last team to make their first appearance in the NL division series, making their debut in 2013 after winning the 2013 National League Wild Card Game. In 2008, the Milwaukee Brewers became the first team to play in division series in both leagues when they won the National League wild card, their first postseason berth since winning the American League East Division title in 1982 before switching leagues in 1998. Milwaukee had competed in an American League Division Series in the strike-shortened 1981 season.

Format
The NLDS is a best-of-five series where the divisional winner with the best winning percentage in the regular season hosts the winner of the Wild Card Series between the top two wild card teams in one matchup, and the divisional winner with the second best winning percentage hosts the winner of the other Wild Card Series between the lowest-seeded divisional winner and the lowest-seeded wild card team. (From 2012 to 2021, the wild card team was assigned to play the divisional winner with the best winning percentage in the regular season in one series, and the other two division winners met in the other series.. From 1998 to 2011, if the wild-card team and the division winner with the best record were from the same division, the wild-card team played the division winner with the second-best record, and the remaining two division leaders played each other.) The two series winners move on to the best-of-seven NLCS. According to Nate Silver, the advent of this playoff series, and especially of the wild card, has caused teams to focus more on "getting to the playoffs" rather than "winning the pennant" as the primary goal of the regular season.

From 2012 to 2021, the wild card team that advances to the Division Series was to face the number 1 seed, regardless whether or not they are in the same division. The two series winners move on to the best-of-seven NLCS. Beginning with the 2022 season, the winner between the lowest-ranked division winner and lowest-ranked wild card team faces the #2 seed division winner in the Division Series, while the 4 v. 5 wild card winner faces the #1 seed, as there is no reseeding regardless of whether the sixth seeded wild card advances. Home-field advantage goes to the team with the better regular season record (or head-to-head record if there is a tie between two or more teams), except for the wild-card team, which never receives the home-field advantage.

Beginning in 2003, MLB has implemented a new rule to give the team from the league that wins the All-Star Game with the best regular season record a slightly greater advantage. In order to spread out the Division Series games for broadcast purposes, the two NLDS series follow one of two off-day schedules. Starting in 2007, after consulting the MLBPA, MLB has decided to allow the team with the best record in the league that wins the All-Star Game to choose whether to use the seven-day schedule (1-2-off-3-4-off-5) or the eight-day schedule (1-off-2-off-3-4-off-5). The team only gets to choose the schedule; the opponent is still determined by win–loss records.

Initially, the best-of-5 series played in a 2–3 format, with the first two games set at home for the lower seed team and the last three for the higher seed. Since 1998, the series has followed a 2–2–1 format, where the higher seed team plays at home in Games 1 and 2, the lower seed plays at home in Game 3 and Game 4 (if necessary), and if a Game 5 is needed, the teams return to the higher seed's field. When MLB added a second wild card team in 2012, the Division Series re-adopted the 2–3 format due to scheduling conflicts. However, it reverted to the 2–2–1 format starting the next season, 2013.

Results

Appearances by team

Years of appearance
In the sortable table below, teams are ordered first by number of wins, then by number of appearances, and finally by year of first appearance. In the "Season(s)" column, bold years indicate winning appearances.

Frequent matchups

NOTE: With the Houston Astros move to the American League at the conclusion of the 2012 season, the Braves vs. Astros series is not currently possible.

See also

American League Division Series (ALDS)
List of American League pennant winners
List of National League pennant winners
List of World Series champions
MLB division winners
MLB postseason

Notes

References

External links
Baseball-Reference.com - annual playoffs
MLB.com - MLB's Division Series historical reference - box scores, highlights, etc.

 
Annual events in Major League Baseball